Nereis is a genus of polychaete worms in the family Nereididae. It comprises many species, most of which are marine. Nereis possess setae and parapodia for locomotion and gas exchange. They may have two types of setae, which are found on the parapodia. Acicular setae provide support. Locomotor setae are for crawling, and are the bristles that are visible on the exterior of the Polychaeta. They are cylindrical in shape, found not only in sandy areas, and they are adapted to burrow. They often cling to seagrass (posidonia) or other grass on rocks and sometimes gather in large groups. 

Nereis worms are commonly known as rag worms or clam worms. The body is long, slender, and dorso-ventrally flattened, reaching a length of 5-30 cm. The head consists of two parts: a roughly triangular anterior lobe—the prostomium—and a posterior ring-like portion—the peristomium. The latter bears four pairs of tentacular cirri, dorsally two pairs of eyes, and ventrally a pair of short two-jointed palps.

Etymology 
The scientific Latin genus name Nereis derives from the Ancient Greek Νηρηΐς : Nērēís (stem Νηρηΐδ- : Nērēid), a  sea nymph.

Ecology
Nereis are osmoconformers. They are dioecious (individuals are male or female) and they release their haploid gametes into the water, a process called spawning. Moreover, upon fertilization and mitotic divisions of the zygote, Nereids form a larval stage which is similar to that of molluscs – i.e. a trochophore larva.

Species
The genus Nereis contains the following species:

Nereis abbreviata Holly, 1935
Nereis abyssa Imajima, 2009
Nereis abyssicola (Horst, 1924)
Nereis acustris Linnaeus, 1767
Nereis aegyptia (Savigny in Lamarck, 1818)
Nereis aestuarensis Knox, 1951
Nereis aibuhitensis (Grube, 1878)
Nereis albipes Grube, 1873
Nereis allenae Pettibone, 1956
Nereis amoyensis (Treadwell, 1936)
Nereis angelensis Fauchald, 1972
Nereis angusta (Kinberg, 1866)
Nereis angusticollis Augener, 1913
Nereis angusticollis Kinberg, 1866
Nereis annularis Blainville, 1818
Nereis anoculis Hartman, 1960
Nereis anoculopsis Fauchald, 1972
Nereis anodonta Schmarda, 1861
Nereis antipoda Knox, 1960
Nereis apaliae Wilson, 1985
Nereis arenaceodonta
Nereis arroyensis Treadwell, 1901
Nereis atlantica McIntosh, 1885
Nereis augeneri Gravier & Dantan, 1934
Nereis badiotorquata (Grube, 1878)
Nereis baliensis (Horst, 1924)
Nereis baolingi Leon-Gonzalez & Solis-Weiss, 2000
Nereis batjanensis (Horst, 1924)
Nereis bifida Hutchings & Turvey, 1982
Nereis bipartita (Bobretzky, 1868)
Nereis blainvillei delle Chiaje, 1828
Nereis broa Lana & Sovierzovsky, 1987
Nereis buitendijki (Horst, 1924)
Nereis caecoides Hartman, 1965
Nereis caerulea Linnaeus, 1758
Nereis cagliari Kinberg, 1866
Nereis calamus Renier, 1804
Nereis callaona (Grube, 1857)
Nereis caparti Fauvel, 1953
Nereis casoae Leon-Gonzalez & Solis-Weiss, 2001
Nereis castelnaui Quatrefages, 1866
Nereis caudata
Nereis caudipunctata (Grube, 1857)
Nereis caymanensis Fauchald, 1977
Nereis chlorodes Blanchard in Gay, 1849
Nereis chrysocephala Pallas, 1788
Nereis cirrhigera Viviani, 1805
Nereis cirriseta Hutchings & Turvey, 1982
Nereis cockburnenesis Augener, 1913
Nereis cockburnensis Augener, 1913
Nereis contorta Dalyell, 1853
Nereis corallina Kinberg, 1866
Nereis cornuta Quatrefages, 1866
Nereis costaricaensis Dean, 2001
Nereis coutieri Gravier, 1900
Nereis coutieri Gravier, 1899
Nereis crassa Gmelin in Linnaeus, 1788
Nereis crocea Renier, 1804
Nereis cuprea delle Chiaje, 1822
Nereis cuprea (Schmarda, 1861)
Nereis cylindraria
Nereis dakarensis Fauvel, 1951
Nereis dayana Sun & Shen in Sun, Wu & Shen, 1978
Nereis delagica Gmelin in Linnaeus, 1788
Nereis delicatula Blanchard in Gay, 1849
Nereis delli Knox, 1960
Nereis denhamensis Augener, 1913
Nereis donghaiensis He & Wu, 1988
Nereis dorsolobata Hartmann-Schröder, 1965
Nereis edwardsii delle Chiaje, 1828
Nereis ehlersiana (Grube, 1878)
Nereis ehrenbergi Grube, 1868
Nereis erythraeensis
Nereis falcaria (Willey, 1905)
Nereis falsa Quatrefages, 1866
Nereis fauchaldi Leon-Gonzalez & Diaz-Castaneda, 1998
Nereis fauveli Gravier & Dantan, 1934
Nereis filicaudata Fauvel, 1951
Nereis foliosa Schmarda, 1861
Nereis fossae Fauchald, 1972
Nereis frontalis Bosc, 1802
Nereis fucata (Savigny in Lamarck, 1818)
Nereis funchalensis (Langerhans, 1880)
Nereis fusifera Quatrefages, 1866
Nereis garwoodi Gonzalez-Escalante & Salazar-Vallejo, 2003
Nereis gayi Blanchard in Gay, 1849
Nereis ghardaqae Hartmann-Schröder, 1960
Nereis gigantea Linnaeus, 1767
Nereis gisserana (Horst, 1924)
Nereis goajirana Augener, 1933
Nereis gracilis (Hansen, 1878)
Nereis granulata Day, 1957
Nereis gravieri Fauvel, 1900
Nereis gravieri Fauvel, 1902
Nereis grayi Pettibone, 1956
Nereis grubei (Kinberg, 1866)
Nereis guangdongensis Wu, Sun & Yang, 1981
Nereis heterocirrata Treadwell, 1931
Nereis heteromorpha (Horst, 1924)
Nereis heterophylla Chamisso & Eysenhardt, 1821
Nereis heteropoda Chamisso & Eysenhardt, 1821
Nereis holochaeta Intes & Le Loeuff, 1975
Nereis homogompha Rullier, 1972
Nereis huanghaiensis Wu, Sun & Yang, 1981
Nereis icosiensis Gravier & Dantan, 1928
Nereis ignota Quatrefages, 1866
Nereis imajimai Leon-Gonzalez & Diaz-Castaneda, 1998
Nereis imbecillis Grube, 1840
Nereis imperfecta Gravier & Dantan, 1936
Nereis inflata Leon-Gonzalez & Solis-Weiss, 2001
Nereis iris Stimpson, 1854
Nereis irrorata
Nereis izukai Okuda, 1939
Nereis jacksoni Kinberg, 1866
Nereis krebsii Grube, 1857
Nereis lamellosa Ehlers, 1864
Nereis languida Kinberg, 1866
Nereis latescens Chamberlin, 1919
Nereis leuca Chamberlin, 1919
Nereis ligulata Hilbig, 1992
Nereis lineata delle Chiaje, 1827
Nereis lingulata Hilbig, 1992
Nereis lithothamnica Annenkova, 1938
Nereis litoralis Leach in Johnston, 1865
Nereis longilingulis Monro, 1937
Nereis longior Chlebovitsch & Wu, 1962
Nereis longisetis McIntosh, 1885
Nereis macropis Ehlers, 1920
Nereis maculosa Renier, 1804
Nereis madreporae
Nereis margarita Montagu, 1804
Nereis marginata Grube, 1857
Nereis mariae Holly, 1935
Nereis marioni Audouin & Milne-Edwards, 1833
Nereis maroccensis Amoureux, 1976
Nereis maxillodentata Hutchings & Turvey, 1982
Nereis mediator Chamberlin, 1918
Nereis mendocinana Chamberlin, 1919
Nereis microcera Quatrefages, 1866
Nereis minima Lamarck, 1801
Nereis mirabilis Kinberg, 1866
Nereis mollis Linnaeus, 1761
Nereis monoceros Dalyell, 1853
Nereis monroi Reish, 1953
Nereis moroccensis Amoureux, 1976
Nereis mortenseni Augener, 1923
Nereis multignatha Imajima & Hartman, 1964
Nereis myersi Holly, 1935
Nereis nancaurica Ehlers, 1904
Nereis nanciae Day, 1949
Nereis natans Hartman, 1936
Nereis neoneanthes Hartman, 1948
Nereis neozealanica Knox, 1951
Nereis nichollsi Kott, 1951
Nereis nigripes Ehlers, 1868
Nereis noctiluca Linnaeus, 1761
Nereis nouhuysi Horst, 1918
Nereis obscura Gravier & Dantan, 1934
Nereis ochotica Grube, 1850
Nereis ockenii delle Chiaje, 1828
Nereis octentaculata Montagu, 1804
Nereis oligohalina (Rioja, 1946)
Nereis onychophora Horst, 1918
Nereis otto delle Chiaje, 1828
Nereis ovarius Read, 1980
Nereis pachychaeta Fauvel, 1919
Nereis panamensis Fauchald, 1977
Nereis pannosa (Grube, 1857)
Nereis parabifida Hutchings & Turvey, 1982
Nereis paucignatha Hartman, 1940
Nereis paulina Grube, 1868
Nereis pectinata Dalyell, 1853
Nereis pelagica Linnaeus, 1758
Nereis perivisceralis Claparède, 1868
Nereis peroniensis Kott, 1951
Nereis persica Fauvel, 1911
Nereis peruviana Ehlers, 1868
Nereis phosphorescens Quatrefages, 1866
Nereis phyllophorus Ross, 1819
Nereis pinnata Müller, 1776
Nereis piscesae Blake & Hillbig, 1990
Nereis posidoniae Hutchings & Rainer, 1979
Nereis procera Ehlers, 1868
Nereis profundi Kirkegaard, 1956
Nereis pseudomoniliformis Santos & Lana, 2003
Nereis pulsatoria (Savigny, 1822)
Nereis punctata Dalyell, 1853
Nereis puncturata Grube, 1857
Nereis quadricorna delle Chiaje, 1841
Nereis quoyii Quatrefages, 1866
Nereis radiata Viviani in Grube, 1850
Nereis ranzani delle Chiaje, 1828
Nereis rava Ehlers, 1864
Nereis regia Quatrefages, 1866
Nereis rigida Grube, 1857
Nereis riisei Grube, 1857
Nereis robusta Quatrefages, 1866
Nereis rufa Pennant, 1812
Nereis rupta Quatrefages, 1866
Nereis sandersi Blake, 1985
Nereis sarsoensis Hartmann-Schröder, 1960
Nereis schmardae Hartmann-Schröder, 1962
Nereis scolopendrina Blainville, 1825
Nereis scolopendroides Hansen, 1882
Nereis segrex Chamberlin, 1919
Nereis semperiana (Grube, 1878)
Nereis serrata Santos & Lana, 2003
Nereis sertularias
Nereis sieboldii Grube, 1873
Nereis sinensis Wu, Sun & Yang, 1981
Nereis singularis Wesenberg-Lund, 1949
Nereis spinigera Hutchings & Turvey, 1982
Nereis splendida Blainville, 1825
Nereis splendida Grube, 1840
Nereis sumbawaensis (Horst, 1924)
Nereis surugaense Imajima, 1972
Nereis talehsapensis Fauvel, 1932
Nereis tenuipalpa Pflugfelder, 1933
Nereis tenuis Webster & Benedict, 1884
Nereis tethycola delle Chiaje, 1831
Nereis thompsoni (Kott, 1951)
Nereis thysanota Ehlers, 1920
Nereis tiedmanni delle Chiaje, 1841
Nereis tigrina Zachs, 1933
Nereis toporoki Khlebovich, 1996
Nereis torta Fauvel, 1934
Nereis translucens Quatrefages, 1866
Nereis triangularis Hutchings & Turvey, 1982
Nereis tydemani (Horst, 1924)
Nereis uncia Holly, 1935
Nereis usticensis Cantone, Catalono & Badalamenti, 2003
Nereis variegata Renier, 1804
Nereis veleronis Hartman, 1940
Nereis ventilabrum Quatrefages, 1866
Nereis vexillosa Grube, 1851
Nereis victoriana Augener, 1918
Nereis villosa Dalyell, 1853
Nereis vitiensis Grube, 1870
Nereis willey Day, 1934
Nereis zhongshaensis Shen & Sun in Sun, Wu & Shen, 1978
Nereis zonata Malmgren, 1867

References

Polychaete genera
Phyllodocida